Paynes Find is a former gold rush settlement approximately  northeast of Perth in the Mid West region of Western Australia.  It is reachable by the Great Northern Highway. Only a roadhouse, which serves as a fuel stop, and a few other buildings remain today. The area is renowned for its wildflowers.

The townsite was gazetted in 1911, the same year the gold battery was constructed. The battery is the only currently operational battery left in the state.

The town is named after the prospector, Thomas Payne, who was the first to discover gold in the area and was the first to register a lease for gold mining with the Mines Department. He was rewarded with free use of the state's gold battery and his ore was the first to be crushed using the battery. The ghost town of Paynesville is also named in his honour.

By the 1930s the town had prospered and the population was estimated at about 500.
In 1987 the battery was sold to the Taylor family who use it as a tourist attraction.

In popular culture 
The character "Dar Dar" in The Numtums was named after Dar Dar Spring near Paynes Find.

References

External links

 Payne's Find at Tourism Western Australia

Mining towns in Western Australia
Towns in Western Australia
Shire of Yalgoo